Fountainhead (also known as the J. Willis Hughes House) is a historic house located at 306 Glenway Drive in Jackson, Mississippi.

Description and history 
The Usonian house designed by architect Frank Lloyd Wright in 1948 and was built during 1950–54 for J. Willis Hughes, who lived in it until January 1980. It is on a 30-60 degree triangle, which results in a grid of equilateral parallelograms. The "bedroom wing terminates in a fountain over a pool, which gives the structure its nickname, Fountainhead." The name "Fountainhead" is also a reference to Ayn Rand's novel, The Fountainhead.

Its 1980 NRHP nomination asserted it was the only Frank Lloyd Wright design in Mississippi, but in fact there are three other homes in Mississippi designed by Wright, in Ocean Springs.

The Hughes House has been a private residence since it was originally built and has never been open to the public. It is owned by Jackson architect Robert Parker Adams.

It was listed on the National Register of Historic Places on November 28, 1980.

References

 Storrer, William Allin. The Frank Lloyd Wright Companion. University Of Chicago Press, 2006,  (S.303)

External links
Photos on Arcaid
Photos on Flickr

Houses on the National Register of Historic Places in Mississippi
Houses completed in 1950
Frank Lloyd Wright buildings
Houses in Jackson, Mississippi
National Register of Historic Places in Jackson, Mississippi